Steve Gray (born August 11, 1956 in Rome, Georgia) is a retired NASCAR Winston Cup Series driver.

Career
Gray has competed from 1979 to 1985 in six different races. Gray has competed in 1321 laps while leading none of them. His average start is 32nd place and his average finish is 29th place; making him finish races generally better than he started them. While failing to qualify at the 1985 Summer 500 racing event, Gray had managed to earn a career total of $10,175 in winnings ($ when adjusted for inflation).

He has served as the crewchief on both the #87 car in both the NASCAR Sprint Cup Series and the Nationwide Series for NEMCO Motorsports and Joe Nemechek.<ref 
He is now team engineer for Rick Ware Racing.>ref
name="stevegray"/>

References

1956 births
Living people
NASCAR drivers
Sportspeople from Rome, Georgia
Racing drivers from Georgia (U.S. state)